Ingrid Margareta Carlberg, (born 30 November 1961) is a Swedish author and journalist. She was elected into the Swedish Academy on 13 October 2020, filling 
the last vacant post in the academy. She replaced Göran Malmqvist on chair number 5.

She is married to former Swedish politician and Minister for Finance Pär Nuder. On 1 July 2021, Carlberg was the summer host of P1.

Selected works

2002 – Jag heter Rosalie, barnbok (Rabén & Sjögren)
2003 – Rosalie på djupt vatten, barnbok (Rabén & Sjögren)
2004 – Min bror Benjamin, ungdomsroman (Rabén & Sjögren)
2005 – Rosalies hemliga kompis, barnbok (Rabén & Sjögren)
2008 – Pillret, reportagebok om antidepressiva läkemedel (Norstedts)
2012 – "Det står ett rum här och väntar på dig ...": berättelsen om Raoul Wallenberg (Norstedts)
2019 − Nobel: den gåtfulle Alfred, hans värld och hans pris (Norstedts)

References

External links

 
 

Living people
1961 births
Members of the Swedish Academy
Swedish writers